Mario Primorac (3 November 1961, Zavidovići, Bosnia and Herzegovina) is a former Bosnian-Herzegovinian basketball player, who works as a coach.

Club career 
He was born in Zavidovići, Bosnia and Herzegovina. His family lived in Žepče. His father was a railway worker, so as a small child he moved to Ploče, and then to Čapljina where he went to school. He started playing basketball relatively late, only in the second grade of high school. Jasmin Repeša persuaded him to train. Ivica Obad, Drago Raguž, Dražen Blažević and others were same generation and trained with him at the time. Here he started his career with KK Borac Čapljina at senior level. 

He later played for KK Bosna Sarajevo for a decade. In 1983/84 with Bosna he was 4th at the European Champions Cup, in the roster: Sabahudin Bilalović, Žarko Varajić, Sabit Hadžić, Predrag Benaček, Emir Mutapčić, Boro Vučević, Mario Primorac, Dragan Lukenda, Anto Đogić, Miroljub Mitrović, and the coach was Svetislav Pešić. Then he went abroad. He played in Germany, Austria and Slovenia for Alba Berlin, Oberwart Gunners, Satex and Zagorje. He ended his playing career at the age of 40. He stayed in basketball as a coach. He was first in the project of his private basketball school Mario Primorac in Maribor. For a long time he led his club, which later merged with Maribor's Branik and was called Branik-Primorac, where he was director and coach. They achieved good results. The seniors played in a strong Slovenian second league. With the juniors they went even further and won the title of champion of Slovenia. In the summer of 2013, he led the Lithuanian club Dzuki from Alytus, but due to disagreements with the home players, he left the club. He returned to his homeland to coach HKK Čapljina. He did not stay long, but not through his own fault, as the club had financial problems.

National Team career 
He has been a member of the national team for many years. He played in EuroBasket 1989 for Yugoslavia, for Bosnia national basketball team  in EuroBasket 1993 and in the qualifications for the EuroBasket 1995.

References

External links 

 FIBA
 Eurobasket Player
 Eurobasket Coach

1961 births
Living people
People from Sarajevo
People from Čapljina
People from Zavidovići
Bosnia and Herzegovina men's basketball players
Bosnia and Herzegovina basketball coaches
Bosnia and Herzegovina expatriate basketball people in Germany
Centers (basketball)
KK Bosna Royal players
Alba Berlin players
Yugoslav expatriate basketball people in Germany
Yugoslav men's basketball players
FIBA EuroBasket-winning players